The 2007 Sultan Qaboos Cup was the 35th edition of the Sultan Qaboos Cup, the premier knockout tournament for football teams in Oman.

The competition began on 15 August 2007 with the Group Stage and concluded on 26 November 2007. Dhofar S.C.S.C. were the defending champions, having won their seventh title in 2006. On Monday 26 November 2007, Sur SC were crowned the champions of the 2007 Sultan Qaboos Cup when they defeated Muscat Club 5–4 on penalties after the match had ended 1-1 after extra time, hence winning the title for the third time.

Teams
This year the tournament had 32 teams. The winners qualified for the 2008 AFC Cup.
 Ahli Sidab Club (Sidab)
 Al-Ittihad Club (Salalah)
 Al-Kamel Wa Al-Wafi SC 
 Al-Khaboora SC (Al-Khaboora)
 Al-Mudhaibi SC (Al-Mudhaibi)
 Al-Musannah SC (Al-Musannah)
 Al-Nahda Club (Al-Buraimi)
 Al-Nasr S.C.S.C. (Salalah)
 Al-Oruba SC (Sur)
 Al-Rustaq SC (Rustaq)
 Al-Salam SC (Sohar)
 Al-Seeb Club (Seeb)
 Al-Shabab Club (Seeb)
 Al-Suwaiq Club (Suwaiq
 Al-Tali'aa SC (Sur)
 Al-Wahda SC (Sur)
 Bahla Club (Bahla)
 Bowsher Club (Bawshar)
 Dhofar S.C.S.C. (Salalah)
 Fanja SC (Fanja)
 Ja'lan SC (Jalan Bani Bu Ali)
 Khasab SC (Khasab)
 Majees SC (Majees)
 Mirbat SC (Mirbat)
 Muscat Club (Muscat)
 Nizwa Club (Nizwa)
 Oman Club (Muscat)
 Saham SC (Saham)
 Salalah SC (Salalah)
 Sohar SC (Sohar)
 Sur SC (Sur)

Group stage

Group A

Group B

Group C

Group D

Group E

Group F

Group G

Group H

Group Stage Results
The first match played was between Al-Nasr S.C.S.C. and Salalah SC on 15 August 2007. 16 teams advanced to the Round of 16.

Round of 16
16 teams played a knockout tie. 8 ties were played over two legs. The first match was played between Sur SC and  Al-Ittihad Club on 6 September 2007. 8 teams advanced to the quarterfinals.

1st Legs

2nd Legs

Quarterfinals
8 teams played a knockout tie. 4 ties were played over two legs. The first match was played between Al-Nahda Club and Bahla Club on 23 September 2007. Al-Nahda Club, Sur SC, Muscat Club and Al-Nasr S.C.S.C. qualified for the semifinals.

1st Legs

2nd Legs

Semifinals
4 teams played a knockout tie. 2 ties were played over two legs. The first match was played between Sur SC and Al-Nasr S.C.S.C. on 18 October 2007. Sur SC and Muscat Club qualified for the finals.

1st Legs

2nd Legs

Finals

References

External links
Oman Sultan Cup 2007-2008 at Goalzz.com

Sultan Qaboos Cup seasons
Cup